Astro Shaw Sdn Bhd is a Malaysian film studio.

Astro Shaw has produced films for the local and regional market and is pursuing expansion into international film investments. It also provides a marketing and distribution services for theatrical and non-theatrical release in Malaysia and abroad.

Astro Shaw has produced 7 of the top 10 highest grossing local films of all time in Malaysia. Astro Shaw's production Hantu Kak Limah shattered the record of Malaysia's box office being the first local film to achieve a box office collection of over RM30 million. In 2018, Astro Shaw achieved a box office collection of over RM100 million with the combination of successful films such as Dukun, Paskal, Hantu Kak Limah and Polis Evo 2.

Astro Shaw distributed and marketed the 2019 kids animation film BoBoiBoy Movie 2.

History

Astro Shaw and Tayangan Unggul
Established in 1996 under the Astro Shaw and Tayangan Unggul brand, its initial focus was to enhance the film industry in Malaysia through high quality production and compelling storytelling. Astro Shaw produced its first film Nafas Cinta in 1998. The movie starred Awie and received a great reception when released in cinemas. Nafas Cinta paved the way for Astro Shaw to expand its film production efforts and since 2001, Astro Shaw has released over 80 films.
In 2010, Astro Shaw further expanded its reach by producing its first Chinese language film Woohoo. Since, Astro Shaw has release 5 more Chinese language films including The Journey.

In 2014, Maindhan became Astro Shaw's first Tamil-language Malaysian film. The film had a limited release on 9 August 2014 in Malaysia, Singapore, and Tamil Nadu. It emerged as the highest grossing locally produced Tamil film of all time before being beaten by Vedigundu Pasangge in 2018 which was co-produced by Astro Shaw.

Box Office
From 2010 to 2013, top grossing Malaysian movies only averaged around RM8 million in the local box office. Astro Shaw defied all odds and raised the benchmark for local films in 2014, breaking the RM15 million mark with The Journey (RM17.28 million). The Journey was the first Chinese language film to top the local box office for its respective release year, a feat no other production company has been able to achieve.

By achieving RM38 million with Hantu Kak Limah, it became the first local film to surpass the RM30 million gross box office (GBO).

Accolades
Astro Shaw produced its first award-winning film KL Menjerit in 2003. The film won in 8 categories for The 16th Malaysia Film Festival including Best Film and 2 categories during the TV3 Screen Awards.

Following from the success of KL Menjerit, Astro Shaw has gone on to win over 170 awards from local and foreign film festivals. Astro Shaw, The Journey won best film in the KL Film Critics Awards and Best Non-Malay Language Local Film and the special Jury Award at the 2014 Malaysia Film Festival. The Journey and Ola Bola were selected to compete in the Far East Film Festival.

Most recently, Astro Shaw's upcoming film The Garden of Evening Mists due to release in January 2020, was nominated in 9 categories for the 56th Golden Horse Awards and won for best Makeup & Costume Design.

Foreign Film Investments
The White Girl (2017), a Hong-Kong film co-directed by Christopher Doyle and Jenny Suen and Astro Shaw's first foray into North Asian films, competed at the 2017 London Film Festival.

Business Expansion
Astro Shaw has since ventured beyond film production and is a film distribution and marketing partner in Malaysia and internationally. The 2019 children's film, BoBoiBoy Movie 2 was distributed and marketed by Astro Shaw.

Films

Malay

English

Tamil

Chinese (Cantonese, Mandarin and Hokkien)

References

 
Astro Malaysia Holdings
Astro Malaysia Holdings subsidiaries
Film production companies of Malaysia
Privately held companies of Malaysia
Mass media companies established in 2005
2005 establishments in Malaysia